Magdala is a town in the Weimarer Land district, in Thuringia, Germany.

History
Within the German Empire (1871-1918), Magdala was part of the Grand Duchy of Saxe-Weimar-Eisenach.

Personalities 

 August Wilhelm Dennstedt (1776-1826), natural scientist, doctor and author. In addition, he was mayor in Magdala and, since 1818, scientific director of the botanical garden  Belvedere  in Weimar.
 Anton Sommer (1816-1888), poet from Rudolstadt, worked temporarily as a house teacher in Magdala
 Heinrich Friedrich Weber (1843-1912), physicist from Magdala, professor at the ETH Zürich

References

Towns in Thuringia
Weimarer Land
Grand Duchy of Saxe-Weimar-Eisenach